The 2018–19 season was Sui Southern Gas's first season in Pakistan Premier League since 2010–11 after winning one-legged promotion after defeating Gwadar Port Authority 7–1 on 17 September 2019.

Coaching staff
{|class="wikitable"
|-
!Position
!Staff
|-
|First-team Manager|| Tariq Lutfi
|-
|rowspan="3"|Assistant Managers|| Shamim Khan
|-
| Saeed Asif
|-
| Nasim Ahmed
|-
|rowspan="3"|Scout|| Amir Ahmed
|-
| Aftab Ahmed
|-
| Sarwar Ali
|-

Other information

|-

First team squad

 

 HG2 = Club-trained player
 U21 = Under-21 player

Competitions

Overall

Competition record

Pakistan Premier League

Table

Matches

National Challenge Cup

Table

Squad statistics

Appearances and goals

Disciplinary record

Top scorers

Captains

References

SSGC
Football clubs in Pakistan